Dubravko Jovanovic (born 11 January 1961 in Belgrade) is a Serbian actor.  His credits includes roles in the films like Beautiful Women Are Passing through City (Lijepe žene prolaze kroz grad), The Crusaders, Pretty Village, Pretty Flame and TV series The Collector.

References

External links
 

1961 births
Living people
Male actors from Belgrade
Serbian male film actors
Serbian male television actors